TRAPPIST-1c, also designated as 2MASS J23062928-0502285 c, is a mainly rocky, Venus-like exoplanet orbiting around the ultracool dwarf star TRAPPIST-1 approximately 40 light-years away from Earth in the constellation Aquarius. It is the most massive and third largest planet of the system, with about 116% the mass and 110% the radius of Earth. Its density indicates a primarily rocky composition with a very thick Venus-like atmosphere, although it is expected to be thinner than that of TRAPPIST-1b.

Physical characteristics

Mass, radius, and temperature
TRAPPIST-1c was observed with the transit method, which enabled scientists to calculate its radius. Transit-timing variations and computer simulations were able to determine the mass, density, and gravity of the planet. TRAPPIST-1c is the third-largest planet of the TRAPPIST-1 system, with a radius of 1.095 . It is also the most massive of the system as well, with a mass of 1.156 , slightly higher than that of the next most massive, TRAPPIST-1g. Despite its Earth-like mass and radius, TRAPPIST-1c has a lower density (4.89 g/cm3) and gravity (0.966g) than Earth. This is consistent with a rock-based composition and a thick, Venus-like atmosphere, similar to TRAPPIST-1b. TRAPPIST-1c's atmosphere is expected to be thinner than that of its inner sibling, but still large enough to raise its surface temperature far above the calculated  equilibrium temperature. In addition, the planet should be very geologically active due to tidal squeezing similar to Jupiter's moon Io, which happens to have a similar orbital period and eccentricity (see TRAPPIST-1#Resonance for references).

Orbit
The orbit of TRAPPIST-1c is very close to its host star. One year on this planet lasts a mere 2.42 days (58 hours), a fraction as long as that of our Solar System's innermost planet, Mercury. The planet orbits at a distance of 0.0158 AU, which is about 1.6% the distance between Earth and the Sun. At this proximity, TRAPPIST-1c is most likely tidally locked. However, due to the small size of its host star, the planet only receives about 2.1 times the sunlight as Earth (similar to Venus, at 1.9 times). Its orbital eccentricity is very low at 0.00654, similar to that of TRAPPIST-1b.

Host star
TRAPPIST-1c orbits the ultracool dwarf star TRAPPIST-1. It is 0.121 R☉ and 0.089 M☉, with a temperature of 2511 K and an age between 3 and 8 billion years. For comparison, the Sun has a temperature of 5778 K and is about 4.5 billion years old. TRAPPIST-1 is also very dim, with about 0.0005 times (0.05%) the luminosity of the Sun. It is too faint to be see with the naked eye, having an apparent magnitude of 18.80.

Atmosphere
The combined transmission spectrum of TRAPPIST-1 b and c rules out a cloud-free hydrogen-dominated atmosphere for each planet, so they are unlikely to harbor an extended gas envelope. Other atmospheres, from a cloud-free water-vapor atmosphere to a Venus-like atmosphere, remain consistent with the featureless spectrum.

In 2018, the composition of TRAPPIST-1c was determined, and has been found to be rock-based with a very thick, Venus-like atmosphere. The atmosphere of TRAPPIST-1c is likely thinner than that of TRAPPIST-1b.

See also
 55 Cancri e
 Gliese 1132 b

References

Exoplanets discovered in 2016
Near-Earth-sized exoplanets
Transiting exoplanets
TRAPPIST-1
Aquarius (constellation)